Woodroffe is an inner-city suburb of Palmerston. It is 25 km southeast of the Darwin CBD and 2.1 km from Palmerston City. Its local government area is the City of Palmerston.

This suburb is named after George Woodroffe Goyder, Surveyor General of South Australia from 1861 to 1893. In 1868–69 Goyder was appointed by the South Australian Government to carry out a survey of land in the Northern Territory.

References

External links
 http://www.id.com.au/nt/commprofile/default.asp?id=251&gid=6070&pg=1

Suburbs of Darwin, Northern Territory
1890s establishments in Australia